Shiro Games is an independent video game development company based in Bordeaux, France. The company was founded in 2012 by Sebastien Vidal and Nicolas Cannasse, and the company is known for their Evoland game, which was developed during the 24th Ludum Dare.

Games

Evoland 

Evoland was initially conceived as a game for the 24th Ludum Dare in 2012. As the theme for that year's competition was "evolution", Vidal and Cannasse chose to have game play change as the player progresses, to reflect on the evolution and history of video game RPGs. As a result, the game was chosen as the winner for the 24th Ludum Dare.

The following year an expanded version of Evoland was released for the PC via Steam, which added a longer player time and new bosses. On Metacritic Evoland holds a rating of 61 based on reviews from 27 critics, which indicates "mixed or average reviews". Destructoid gave the game a rating of 7.5 out of 10, writing "A solid game that definitely has an audience. Might lack replay value, could be too short or there are some hard-to-ignore faults, but the experience is fun."

Evoland 2 

In 2014 Shiro Games announced that they were working on a sequel to Evoland entitled Evoland 2: A Slight Case of Spacetime Continuum Disorder. The game would follow the same game play and format as the first game while introducing a more complex history, new forms of gameplay, and less linearity than its predecessor. The game was released on August 25, 2015.

Northgard 
Inspired by Nordic mythology, Northgard is a real-time strategy game where a Viking clan tries to take control over a wild continent. The game contains both single-player and multi-player modes, as well as a story-based campaign, with missions of increasing difficulty and complexity. In the story, the player plays as Rig, a prince who seeks to avenge the death of his father the High King at the hands of Hagen, the ruthless leader of Clan of the Raven. The young prince will sail to the island of Northgard to fulfill its mission, and in the process it will meet other clans and creatures.

The site describes the game as follows: "After years of tireless explorations, brave Vikings have discovered a new land filled with mystery, danger and riches: Northgard. The boldest Northmen have set sail to explore and conquer these new shores, bring fame to their Clan and write history through conquest, trading, or devotion to the Gods. That is, if they can survive the dire wolves and undead warriors roaming the land, befriend or defeat the giants, and survive the harshest winters ever witnessed in the North."

Northgard was first released on PC on March 7, 2018. Console versions followed with releases on the Xbox One on September 24, 2019, Nintendo Switch on September 26, 2019, and PlayStation 4 on October 3, 2019. Mobile versions were released for iOS devices on April 13, 2021 and Android devices on August 23, 2021.

Darksburg 
In 2018 at Gamescom, Shiro Games announced the development of Darksburg, a cooperative survival game in a fantasy medieval setting. The early access version was released in February 2020.

Dune: Spice Wars 

In late 2021, shortly after the release of Denis Villeneuve's Dune movie adaptation, Shiro Games announced that they had been working on a real-time 4X strategy game based on the Dune universe. The game, developed by Shiro Games and published by Funcom, has been released for early access on the Steam platform on 26 April 2022.

Cancelled and suspended projects 
In 2013 Shiro Games announced that they would be developing a game titled Until Dark, which they described as a "cooperative exploration game" in a vast and mysterious world. In 2014 Shiro Games announced through the game's official website that they had stalled development due to their lack of satisfaction with the game's current design and that they would try to revisit the game as time allowed.

References

External links 
 

Video game companies established in 2012
Video game companies of France
French companies established in 2012
Companies based in Bordeaux
Video game development companies